Shahrak-e Kola Siah (also Romanized as Shahrak-e Kolāh Sīāh; also known as Kolāh Sīāh) is a village in Mashayekh Rural District, Doshman Ziari District, Mamasani County, Fars Province, Iran. At the 2006 census, its population was 811, in 235 families.

References 

Populated places in Mamasani County